Phyllis Constance Williams (née Morris; 31 March 1905 – 26 July 1993) was a notable New Zealand singer and horsewoman. She was born in Gisborne, New Zealand, in 1905.

References

1905 births
1993 deaths
People from Gisborne, New Zealand
20th-century New Zealand women  singers